Statistics of Swedish football Division 3 for the 1932–33 season.

League standings

Uppsvenska 1932–33

Östsvenska 1932–33

Mellansvenska 1932–33

Nordvästra 1932–33

Södra Mellansvenska 1932–33

Sydöstra 1932–33

Västsvenska 1932–33

Sydsvenska 1932–33

Footnotes

References 

Swedish Football Division 3 seasons
3
Sweden